Wong Sio Chak (born September 1968) is a Macau politician who is the current Secretary for Security of Macau, fourth most senior government official in Macau.

Early life
Wong was born in Guangdong province on September 1968. He received a bachelor's and doctorate degrees in law from Peking University.

Careers
Working at the Judicial Police, Wong was a senior technician in 1994 and judicial auditor in 1994-1995. In 1997, he was appointed prosecutor at the Prosecution Service. At the Judiciary Police, he was appointed as Deputy Director in 1998 and acting Director in 1999. He was appointed Deputy Prosecutor-General of the Public Prosecution Office in March 2000 and appointed Director of Judiciary Police in November 2000.

Personal life
Wong is married with two daughters.

References

External links
 Secretary for Security - Wong Sio Chak

1968 births
Living people
Macanese people
Government ministers of Macau
Peking University alumni